Clayton J. Lloyd International Airport  (formerly known as the Anguilla Wallblake Airport) is a small international airport located on the island of Anguilla, a British Overseas Territory in the Caribbean.  It is located very close to The Valley, the island's capital. Wallblake Airport is also a featured airport in one of the Flight Simulator X game demos. It has a small terminal with no jetways and is the only airport in Anguilla.

The airport became known as the "Clayton J. Lloyd International Airport" on 4 July 2010.  Its namesake was the first Anguillan aviator and founded the first Anguillan air service, Air Anguilla, which was later renamed Valley Air Service. The airport houses the Anguilla Outstation of the Eastern Caribbean Civil Aviation Authority.

Airlines and destinations

Passenger

New jet service

American Airlines initiated new, twice weekly nonstop jet service between its Miami (MIA) hub and Anguilla on 11 December 2021 operated by its American Eagle affiliate with Embraer ERJ-175 regional jets.

Cargo

Notable flights 
In recent history, a Boeing 737-300 jetliner landed at the airport as well as an McDonnell Douglas MD-83 jetliner carrying the FIFA World Cup Trophy Tour.

On 4 January 2023 an Airbus 320 neo from Avianca El Salvador landed for the first time in Anguilla.

References

External links
 Wallblake Airport
 
 

Airports in Anguilla
Geography of Anguilla